Dinonigidius bartolozzii, is a species of stag beetle endemic to Sri Lanka.

Description
Average length is about 9.0 mm. Body piceous in color, whereas clypeus, mandibles, legs, and venter are pale red. Head shiny, and punctate, where these coarse and dense punctures are clothed with short setae. Clypeus declivous, and narrowing between mandibles to subtruncate apex. Eyes are narrow and uniform. Temporal process is large, and projecting posteriorly as a triangular lobe. Antennal club is small, and shorter than scape, and consists with 8 to 10 clubbed entirely tomentose antennomeres. Mandibles are shorter than the head, with acute apex, and abraded teeth. Mentum is broad, bilobed, and clothed by coarse irregular dense punctures. Pronotum short, with anterior tumosity and emarginate anterior angles. Elytra form parallel-sided, striate with coarse, oval, contiguous punctures. Females possess simple mandibles without the vertical ramus found in males. Males also lack the anterior pronotal process which is found in the other Sri Lankan relative, Dinonigidius ahenobarbus.

References 

Lucanidae
Insects of Sri Lanka
Insects described in 2016